Shuiwan station is a metro station on Line 2 of the Shenzhen Metro. It opened on 28 December 2010.

It caters to people living in the residential developments around Coastal Rose Garden and its vicinity, on Wanghai Road.

Incident 
On 17 February 2014, a female IBM project manager fell into the Exit C pedestrian subway. Seven people passing helped rescue her from the subway. Station staff immediately sounded the alarm and called 120. Emergency personnel arrived on the scene nearly 50 minutes after the incident, and she was found dead.

Station layout

Exits

References

External links
 Shenzhen Metro Shuiwan Station (Chinese)
 Shenzhen Metro Shuiwan Station (English)

Shenzhen Metro stations
Railway stations in Guangdong
Nanshan District, Shenzhen
Railway stations in China opened in 2010